The 2015 BYU Cougars men's soccer team is part of the  BYU Athletics program but does not play in a college conference. During the 2015 USL Premier Development League. The Cougars were coached for a 21st consecutive season by Chris Watkins. The Cougars finished the season 1-5-8. After the season Coach Watkins announced he would be retiring as head coach of the men's soccer team.

Media

Television & Internet Streaming
All BYU Cougars home games were streamed live on YouTube.

Regular season

Real Colorado

Albuquerque

FC Tucson
Broadcasters: John Pearlman & Jeff Rogers (YouTube)

Real Colorado
Broadcasters: Dave Neeley & Hugh Van Wagenen (YouTube)

Real Colorado
Broadcasters: Dave Neeley & Carla Swensen (YouTube)

Las Vegas
Broadcasters: Dave Neeley & Carla Swensen (YouTube)

Albuquerque
Broadcasters: Dave Neeley, Hugh Van Wagenen, & Carla Swensen (YouTube)

FC Tucson
Broadcasters: Skyler Hardman & Hugh Van Wagenen (YouTube)

FC Tucson
Broadcasters: Mitchell Marshall & Carla Swensen (YouTube)

Las Vegas

Las Vegas

Burlingame
Broadcasters: Carla Swensen & Hugh Van Wagenen (YouTube)

Burlingame
Broadcasters: Jason Long & Andreas Wolf (Bay Area Online Sports Network)

Real Monarchs
BYU and Real Colorado were scheduled to play each other for the finale on July 15. Real Colorado withdrew from the game claiming there were travel conflicts, giving BYU their lone win of the year. Real Colorado was also deducted 3 points for league violations. BYU then scheduled a match with the Real Monarchs for their senior night match.

Broadcasters: Dave Neeley & Carla Swensen (YouTube)

2015 Lamar Hunt U.S. Open Cup
For the first time since 2007 BYU was invited to participate in the Lamar Hunt U.S. Open Cup. The field expansion to 91 teams gave the Cougars only their third ever invitation. The Cougars were given a bye from the qualifying round and a host location for the first round where they would meet new team Harpo's FC, a squad sponsored by Avery Brewing Company of Colorado. If they could win it would give BYU their first ever win in the U.S. Open Cup.

The Cougars and Harpo's FC would play a penalty free match and a full 120 minutes of scoreless play setting up a shootout for the right to advance to the second round.

Broadcasters: Dave Neeley & Hugh Van Wagenen (YouTube)

Roster

Standings

References

2015 in sports in Utah
USL League Two seasons